In organic chemistry, free-radical addition is an addition reaction which involves free radicals. The addition may occur between a radical and a non-radical, or between two radicals.

The basic steps with examples of the free-radical addition (also known as radical chain mechanism) are:
 Initiation by a radical initiator: A radical is created from a non-radical precursor.
 Chain propagation: A radical reacts with a non-radical to produce a new radical species
 Chain termination: Two radicals react with each other to create a non-radical species

Free-radical reactions depend on a reagent having a (relatively) weak bond, allowing it to homolyse to form radicals (often with heat or light). Reagents without such a weak bond would likely proceed via a different mechanism. An example of an addition reaction involving aryl radicals is the Meerwein arylation.

Addition of mineral acid to an alkene 

To illustrate, consider the alkoxy radical-catalyzed, anti-Markovnikov reaction of hydrogen bromide to an alkene. In this reaction, a catalytic amount of organic peroxide is needed to abstract the acidic proton from HBr and generate the bromine radical, however a full molar equivalent of alkene and acid is required for completion.

Note that the radical will be on the more substituted carbon. Free-radical addition does not occur with the molecules HCl or HI. Both reactions are extremely endothermic and are not chemically favored.

Self-terminating oxidative radical cyclizations
In one specific type of radical addition called self-terminating oxidative radical cyclization, alkynes are oxidized to ketones through intramolecular radical cyclization where the radical species are inorganic rather than carbon based. This type of reaction is self-terminating because propagating is not possible and the initiator is used in stoichiometric amounts. 

As an example, a nitrate radical is generated by photolysis of ammonium cerium(IV) nitrate (CAN) which reacts with an alkyne to generate; first, a very reactive vinyl radical; then, via 1,5-hydrogen atom transfer (HAT) and 5-exo-trig ring-closure, a ketyl radical. The produced ketyl dislodges a nitrite radical which is not reactive enough for propagation and thus, the ketone is formed.

The radical species in effect is a single oxygen atom synthon. Other inorganic radicals that show this type of reactivity are sulfate radical ions (from ammonium persulfate) and hydroxyl radicals.

See also
 The other radical reactions: radical substitution and radical polymerization.

References

Addition reactions
Free radical reactions
Reaction mechanisms